Mezepine is a tricyclic antidepressant (TCA) that was never marketed.

See also 
 Tricyclic antidepressant

References 

Amines
Dibenzazepines
Tricyclic antidepressants
Abandoned drugs